Every year, each of the 50 United States state supreme courts decides hundreds of cases. Of those cases dealing with state law, a few significantly shape or re-shape the law of their state or are so influential that they later become models for decisions of other states or the federal government, or are noted for being rejected by other jurisdictions.  The same is true of those cases involving a federal question, except that these may be appealed to the United States Supreme Court. This list contains notable final decisions of these courts – those that were not subject to appeal, or from which no appeal was taken, or from which an appeal was taken but certiorari was denied. Appealed decisions that are notable primarily because of later actions of the U.S. Supreme Court covered in the listings of U.S. Supreme Court cases. The decisions are listed in chronological order.

1900–1949
Wood v. Lucy, Lady Duff-Gordon, 222 N.Y. 88, 118 N.E. 214 (N.Y. 1917): A  contract for exclusive representation implied consideration.
Dodge v. Ford Motor Company, 204 Mich. 459, 170 N.W. 668 (Mich. 1919): Owners of a company with investors have a duty to operate the business for profitable purposes as opposed to charitable purposes.
Meinhard v. Salmon, 249 N.Y. 458, 164 N.E. 545 (N.Y. 1928): A fiduciary duty exists between business partners.
Palsgraf v. Long Island Railroad Co., 162 N.E. 99 (N.Y. 1928): Liability for injuries caused by negligence extends only to those within a zone of danger within which the injury was foreseeable.
Hawkins v. McGee, 84 N.H. 114, 146 A. 641 (N.H. 1929): Expectation damages in contracts.

1950–Present
 Lucy v. Zehmer, 196 Va. 493; 84 S.E.2d 516 (1954): Validity of a contract based on reasonable inferences drawn from other party's behavior
Garratt v. Dailey, 279 P.2d 1091 (Wash. 1955): Tortious intent of a child
Katko v. Briney, 183 N.W.2d 657 (Iowa 1971): Landowners have no right to set deadly traps against trespassers on their property.
Baker v. Nelson, 291 Minn. 310 (Minn. 1971): Same-sex marriage prohibited in Minnesota.
The People v. Robert Page Anderson, 64 Cal.2d 633, 414 P.2d 366 (Cal. 1972): Capital punishment unconstitutional in California
Li v. Yellow Cab Co., 13 Cal.3d 804 (1975):  comparative negligence
Tarasoff v. Regents of the University of California, 17 Cal. 3d 425, 551 P.2d 334, 131 Cal. Rptr. 14 (Cal. 1976): Mental health professionals have a duty to protect specific persons who were threatened by their patients.
Goodridge v. Department of Public Health, 798 N.E.2d 941 (Mass. 2003): Right of same-sex couples to marry in Massachusetts.
Bush v. Schiavo, 885 So.2d 321 (Fla. 2004): A law enacted to permit the governor to retroactively stay court-ordered removal of a feeding tube was an unconstitutional invasion of the separation of powers.
People v. LaValle, 3 N.Y.3d 88 (2004): Death penalty statute declared unconstitutional in New York.
Lewis v. Harris, 908 A.2d 196 (N.J. 2006): Holding that same-sex couples deserve equal rights under the law, but stopping short of creating same-sex marriage.
Varnum v. Brien, WL 874044 (Iowa 2009): Holding that Iowa's defense of marriage act violated the equal protection clause of the Iowa Constitution.

See also
List of sources of law in the United States
List of United States Supreme Court cases
List of notable United States Courts of Appeals cases

External links
 

United States courts of appeals
Supreme court case law